Inadiatafane  is a village and commune of the Cercle of Gourma-Rharous in the Tombouctou Region of Mali. The commune contains 25 villages and in the 2009 census had a population of 3,557.

References

External links
.
.

Communes of Tombouctou Region